Josef Löwy (16 August 1834, in Pressburg – 24 March 1902, in Vienna) was an Austrian painter, publisher, industrialist and Imperial and Royal court photographer.

Life 
In 1848, Löwy moved to Vienna, where he learned lithography. He then studied painting at the Academy of Fine Arts Vienna. He opened his first studio in Vienna in 1856. In 1859, he moved to a new studio. One of his premises was related in the Weihburggasse 31, 1 District. In 1861, he joined the Photographischen Gesellschaft in Vienna and in 1864, he participated in the first photographic exhibition in Vienna. Between 1866 and 1873, he had a summer studio in Baden bei Wien. Since 1872, he worked on the Collagraphy processes and he founded a studio for industrial shots in the Landstraße district.

In 1873, Löwy joined the Viennese Photographers Association which was founded for the 1873 World Fair in Vienna. This had the license for the production of photographs in the exhibition grounds. In the same year and in part as a result of his participation in the world fair he became court photographer to Emperor Franz Joseph.

Among other things, Löwy became known for his industrial photographs, starting from the 1880s, made using heliography. In 1885, he founded a dry plate production business with the amateur photographer Josef Plener. He also became internationally known for his photographic reproductions business. The main subjects of his photography were portraits, Viennese architecture, art and nude photography. His company was continued by his widow Mathilde Löwy and then in 1908 by nephew Gustav Löwy under the name "Kunstanstalt J. Löwy".

Works 
Löwy published a variety of books:
 J.Löwy in the Österreichischen Nationalbibliothek
 Josef Löwy in the Österreichischen Nationalbibliothek

Awards 
 1873 – Title of Court Photographer (Hofphotograph) (by Emperor Franz Joseph I of Austria)

Literature 
 
  Welt ausstellen. Herausgeber Technisches Museum Wien, S. 110–111, Beiträge von: Ulrike Felber, Manuela Fellner-Feldhaus und Elke Krasny dt. /engl.,

External links 
 Timm Starl, Fotobibl. Biobibliografie zur Fotografie in Österreich 1839 bis 1945 - auf der Homepage der Wiener Albertina
 Österreich-Lexikon)
 ; im WebCite-Archiv

References 

19th-century Austrian photographers
1834 births
1902 deaths
Purveyors to the Imperial and Royal Court
Austro-Hungarian Jews
Artists from Bratislava
Jewish painters
20th-century Austrian photographers
Businesspeople from Bratislava